The Yeronga South Brisbane Football Club, often known simply as Yeronga and nicknamed the Devils,  is an Australian rules football club that plays in Division 2 of the Queensland Football Association (QFA) men's leagues and in the AFL Queensland Women's League (QAFLW). The club has previously competed in the Queensland Australian National Football League (QANFL).

History

South Brisbane Football Club
An early mention of a club in formation known as the "South Brisbane Football Club" to play under Australian Rules appears in The Brisbane Courier on 25 September 1886. Colours and name were chosen and a foundation meeting took place at the Palace Hotel. Mr. L. H. Nathan occupied tho chair and John Hardgrave was president. The club trained at Musgrave Park in West End. The last mention of this club being active was in 1889, after which in 1894 rugby and soccers club were formed under the same name. Given the 20-year gap it is unlikely that there is continuity between this club and the current day club. There is mention of the Australian Rules club in retrospect in 1897 however.

It is more likely that the South Brisbane Football Club that is part of today's Yeronga club has its origins in 1910. On 21 May 1910, there is a mention of the South Brisbane Football club from A. S. Gerrand club president and treasurer of the Queensland Football League calling for Victorian teams to stage an exhibition match ruing the lack of interest from Victoria in promoting the game where the clubs efforts to re-establish the code where three British football codes were now more popular. A photo of a 1910 South Brisbane premiership side wearing the colours of Essendon.

Yeronga Football Club
Yeronga Football Club was formed in 1928 and originally wore blue jumpers with a white vee. The club made two QANFL grand finals in the 1930s, losing to Windsor on both occasions.

Yeronga-South Brisbane Merger
A merger between the Yeronga and South Brisbane clubs appears to have taken place sometime after World War II. The new Yeronga South Brisbane club competed in various competitions, including the state league in 1945 and 1946, from 1949 to 1952, and in 1957 and 1960. The team wore jerseys from army disposals, playing in Footscray and Essendon colours at different times. There was an additional merger with Coorparoo Football Club for the 1953 and 1954 seasons with the team competing under the name Coorparoo-Yeronga before separating.

The club was relegated from the QAFL's top division in 1960 and many senior players were lost to other clubs. The club fielded only junior teams for several years before returning to senior football in 1967.

In 1972, Yeronga moved its headquarters to Leyshon Park. The foundations of the clubhouse had just been laid when they were washed away in the 1974 Brisbane flood. Cansdale Street, which leads to the ground, was named to honour the family of John Cansdale, who played for Yeronga from 1945 to 1969. The club was unable to use Leyshon Park during its centenary in 2010 because the ground was being transformed into the new centre of excellence for AFL Queensland. Since the redevelopment, the ground has hosted many Grand Finals and matches involving the Brisbane Lions and Gold Coast Suns Academy teams.

Yeronga won its first senior flag in 2006 when coach Tom Corless led it to victory in the Division 1 Grand Final of the Queensland Football Association. The team successfully defended its premiership the following year defeating University of Queensland 11.11 (77) to 6.7 (43) in the Grand Final.

Yeronga South Brisbane entered the AFL Queensland Women's League in 2011. The team was immediately successful and won premierships in its first two years. From the Preliminary Final in 2011 to the Second Semi Final in 2013, Yeronga won 27 matches in a row before losing the 2013 Grand Final to Coorparoo. In addition to winning two more grand finals, ten players (as of the 2020 AFL Women's draft) have been drafted directly from Yeronga into the AFLW competition.

Auslan Team Song
On 9 August 2020, a video of the women's Development League team singing the club song while signing it in Auslan for the benefit of player Jamie Howell, who is deaf, was uploaded to Instagram. The video went viral and was shared on social media by celebrities including Adam Hills and Dylan Alcott. Journalist Peter FitzSimons, writing in the Sydney Morning Herald, stated that "sports stories don't get a whole lot better than this". In 2021, Howell was named as the AFLW Premiership Cup Ambassador.

Notable players

Men 
Matt Eagles
Harry Pegg
Al Sanders
Darryl Sanders
Leyland Sanders
Cyril Smith

Women 
Lauren Arnell
Emily Bates
Katie Brennan
Sabrina Frederick
Dee Heslop
Jessy Keeffe
Delissa Kimmince
Kate Lutkins
Kate McCarthy
Jade Pregelj
Sam Virgo
Jacqui Yorston
Jordan Zanchetta

Honours

Team

Men
 QANFL
 Runners-up (2): 1932, 1937
 AFLQSA 
 Division One (2): 2006, 2007
 Division Five (1): 2018

Women
 QAFLW
 Winners (4): 2011, 2012, 2017, 2020
 Runners-up (2): 2013, 2016

Notes

Individual

Men
Grogan Medalists (2)
 Fred Willets (1947 - tied)
 Bill Shorten (1951)

Top Goalkicker (3)
 Al Sanders (1948, 1949)
 Darryl Sanders (1954) (for Coorparoo-Yeronga)

Women
QAFLW Best and Fairest (6)
 Kate Lutkins (2013)
 Jordan Zanchetta (2015 - tied, 2020 - tied)
 Sam Virgo (2016 - tied)
 Kate McCarthy (2017)
 Emily Bates (2019)

Leading Goalkicker (5)
 Caitlin Collins (2012)
 Hayley Newberry (2015)
 Jade Ransfield (2016 - tied, 2017 - tied)
 Lexi Edwards (2020 - tied)

Grand Final Best on Ground (5)
 Kate Lutkins (2011)
 Emily Bates (2012, 2017)
 Jordan Zanchetta (2013, 2020)

References

External links
 Official site

Queensland State Football League clubs
Australian rules football clubs in Brisbane
1928 establishments in Australia
Australian rules football clubs established in 1928